Maldivian Sign Language (MvSL) is a sign language that was developed, largely spontaneously, by deaf children in a number of schools in Maldives in the 2000. It is of particular interest to the linguists who study it because it offers a unique opportunity to study what they believe to be the birth of a new language.

The dictionary contains signs for around 650 words supported with English and Dhivehi description explaining the hand-shape and the movement to be used while signing a particular word.

References

External links
 President launches Maldivian Sign Language Dictionary, 28 October 2009

Sign language isolates
Languages of the Maldives
Sign languages